Virtual legacy wires (VLW) are transactions over the Intel QuickPath Interconnect and Intel Ultra Path Interconnect interconnect fabrics that replace a particular set of physical legacy pins on Intel microprocessors. The legacy wires replaced include the INTR, A20M, and SMI legacy signals.

See also
 A20 line
 INTR
 System Management Mode

References

X86 architecture